The Fédération internationale de ski et de snowboard (FIS) is the highest international governing body for skiing and snowboarding. Founded on 2 February 1924 in Chamonix, France during the inaugural Winter Olympic Games, the FIS is responsible for the Olympic skiing disciplines, namely Alpine skiing, cross-country skiing, ski jumping, Nordic combined, freestyle skiing, and snowboarding. The FIS is also responsible for setting the international competition rules. The organization has a membership of 132 national ski associations, and is based in Oberhofen am Thunersee, Switzerland. It changed its name to include snowboard on 26 May 2022, during the FIS Congress in Milan.

Most World Cup wins 
More than 45 World Cup wins in all disciplines run by International Ski Federation for men and ladies: 

Updated as of 21 March 2021

Ski disciplines
The federation organises the following ski sport disciplines, for which it oversees World Cup competitions and World Championships:

FIS Congress history

Founding and the first years

After ski club federations and national associations were created in Norway (1883 and 1908), Russia (1896), Bohemia and Great Britain (1903), Switzerland (1904), United States, Austria and Germany (all in 1905) and Sweden, Finland and Italy (all in 1908), and competitions had begun such as the Nordic Games, early international cross-country races (Adelboden, 1903), international participation at Holmenkollen (1903) and Club Alpin Français (CAF) International Winter Sports Weeks, an international Ski Congress was convened to develop standard rules for international competitive skiing.

The founding of a predecessor association, the International Ski Commission (CIS), was decided on February 18, 1910, in Christiania, Norway by delegates from ten countries to the first International Ski Congress. This Congress then met every year or so to hear from the CIS and refine and adopt rule changes.  The commission was to consist of two members - a representative of Scandinavia and Central Europe. Ultimately, two Scandinavians sat on the commission. A year later, in March 1911, the first internationally valid set of rules was approved. At that time, the commission was enlarged to five members, and Oslo was elected as headquarters.

In 1913, the number of members of the commission was increased to seven: two Norwegians, two Swedes, a Swiss, a German and an Austrian.

On February 2, 1924, in Chamonix as part of the "International Winter Sports Week", which was later to be recognized as the first Olympic Winter Games, 36 delegates from 14 countries (Great Britain, Austria, Czechoslovakia, Finland, France, Yugoslavia, Norway, Poland, Romania, USA, Switzerland, Sweden, Hungary and Italy) decided to found the FIS, which replaced the CIS.

Initially, the FIS was only responsible for Nordic skiing.  FIS Nordic World Ski Championships 1925 in Janské Lázně, Czechoslovakia, were given status as the first official World Championships. After the Scandinavian countries had relented, it was decided at the 11th FIS Congress (February 24–26, 1930 in Oslo) to also include alpine skiing (downhill, slalom and alpine combined) in the rules. This was upon a proposal by Great Britain, in which the British ski pioneer Arnold Lunn played a major role as co-founder of the Arlberg-Kandahar races. The simple sentence "Downhill and slalom races may be organized" was written into the rules - a sentence that was to change skiing in the long term. The first FIS Alpine World Ski Championships were held 19–23 February 1931 in Mürren, Switzerland.

Ski flying, a variation of ski jumping, was recognized as a discipline in 1938, but rules were not finalized until after World War II.

List of Ski Congresses

Presidents

Members

Official FIS ski museums 

As of 2017, there are 31 official FIS Ski Museums worldwide in 13 countries which are devoted to the history of skiing, taking into account the region's own history of skiing and tourism.

List of FIS ski museums 

 FIS Skimuseum Damüls, Vorarlberg (Austria)
 FIS-Winter!Sport!Museum! Mürzzuschlag (Austria)
 FIS-Landes-Skimuseum Werfenweng (Austria)
 FIS-Ski-Museum Vaduz (Liechtenstein)

See also
 Alpine Skiing Europa Cup
 FIS Alpine Ski World Cup
 FIS Cross-Country World Cup
 FIS Freestyle Ski World Cup
 FIS Nordic Combined World Cup
 FIS Ski Jumping World Cup
 FIS Snowboard World Cup

References

External links 
 
 FIS Official YouTube

 
Skiing organizations
International sports bodies based in Switzerland
Oberhofen am Thunersee
IOC-recognised international federations
Sports organizations established in 1924
1924 establishments in France